William Michael Hendry (born 10 November 1986 in Maidenhead, Berkshire, England) is an English footballer playing as a midfielder for Hayes & Yeading United. He played in The Football League for Millwall.

Club career
Hendry returned to Hayes & Yeading United in December 2011, having previously been a part of the side that earned promotion to the Conference National in May 2009.

References

External links

1986 births
Living people
People from Maidenhead
English footballers
Association football midfielders
Millwall F.C. players
Hayes F.C. players
Grays Athletic F.C. players
Hayes & Yeading United F.C. players
Dagenham & Redbridge F.C. players
Maidenhead United F.C. players
AFC Wimbledon players
Eastleigh F.C. players
National League (English football) players
English Football League players